Rich is a masculine given name, often short for Richard. People with the name include:

 Rich Campbell (American football) (born 1958), American former National Football League quarterback
 Rich Coady (center) (born 1944), American National Football League center
 Rich Coady (defensive back) (born 1976), American National Football League defensive back, son of the above
 Rich Cronin (1974–2010), American singer-songwriter, member of the band LFO
 Rich Eisen (born 1969), American television journalist
 Rich Franklin (born 1974), American retired mixed martial artist
 Rich Gannon (born 1965), American football player
 Rich Hall (born 1954), American comedian
 Rich Hill (baseball coach) (born 1962), American head baseball coach at the University of San Diego
 Rich Hill (pitcher) (born 1980), American Major League Baseball pitcher
 Rich Johnson (basketball) (1946–1994), American basketball player
 Rich Johnson (publishing executive), publishing executive in the field of graphic novels
 Rich Jones (basketball) (born 1946), retired American Basketball Association and National Basketball Association player
 Rich Jones (musician) (born 1973), English guitarist
 Rich King (basketball) (born 1969), American National Basketball Association player
 Rich King (sportscaster) (born 1947), American television sportscaster
 Rich Kreitling (1936–2020), American retired National Football League player
 Rich Lowry (born 1968), American magazine editor, syndicated columnist, author and political commentator
 Rich Milot (1957–2021), American retired National Football League player
 Rich Moore (born 1963), American animation director
 Rich Moore (American football) (born 1947), American football player
 Rich Mullins (1955–1997), American contemporary Christian music singer and songwriter
 Rich Robertson (left-handed pitcher) (born 1968), American former Major League Baseball pitcher
 Rich Robertson (right-handed pitcher) (born 1944), American former Major League Baseball pitcher
 Rich Rodriguez (born 1963), American football coach and former player
 Rich Sommer (born 1978), American actor
 Rich Swann (born 1991), American professional wrestler
 Rich Thompson (disambiguation)
 Rich Vos (born 1957), American stand-up comedian, writer and actor
 Rich Wilson (journalist), UK-based freelance rock music writer 

English masculine given names
Masculine given names
Hypocorisms